Saleh al-Ashwan is a member of the Saudi Civil and Political Rights Association, an organization that has advocated for the release of political prisoners and greater respect for human rights in Saudi Arabia and that was banned in March 2013. Saudi authorities arrested al-Ashwan in July 2012 for defending women's rights and held him without trial or access to lawyers for nearly four years, while confiscating his electronic devices. During his first two months of detention he was held incommunicado and Saudi activists allege that he was tortured, beaten, as well as stripped and suspended by his limbs from the ceiling of an interrogation room. In 2016 a Saudi court sentenced al-Ashwan to five years in prison and a five-year ban on travel abroad. He is currently held in al-Ha’ir prison south of Riyadh. Due to these abuses, he is considered to be a prisoner of conscience by Amnesty International.

References

Saudi Arabian human rights activists
Amnesty International prisoners of conscience held by Saudi Arabia
Living people
Saudi Arabian prisoners and detainees
People of the Arab Spring
Year of birth missing (living people)